The Stanley Cup ring is a championship ring, an annual award in the National Hockey League given by the team that wins the Stanley Cup Finals, a best-of-seven series to determine the league's champion that season. In addition to the winning players, teams give rings to coaches, trainers, scouts, executives, and other staff members. Teams often give rings to players who played for the team, but do not qualify to have their name engraved on the Stanley Cup. The most ever won by a single player was Henri Richard with 11 total championship ring.

History

The Stanley Cup ring was established in 1893, when the Montreal Hockey Club won the 1893 Stanley Cup championship. Since that championship, the rings weren't given again until the Ottawa Senators won the 1927 Stanley Cup Finals. There have been cases in which championship teams have not awarded rings to its players, such as the Montreal Hockey Club's second championship (which gave out watches) and the 1915 champions, the Vancouver Millionaires (which issued medallions).

For many years teams did not give any rings at all and players had to buy them for themselves. In the 1950s The Detroit Red Wings won the Stanley Cup four times, but players were given silverware or bought a dinner instead of rings. Players were eventually given rings by the team more than fifty years later. In the 1960s the Toronto Maple Leafs won the Stanley Cup four times, but players were originally only given one ring with diamonds that were removed and enlarged for each subsequent win. In 1971 the Montreal Canadiens gave players television sets instead of rings. Since 1972, every winning team has awarded more Stanley Cup Rings than the number of names engraved on the Stanley Cup. In 2011 Boston Bruins owner Jeremy Jacobs gave out a record 504 Stanley Cup rings to anyone connected with the team.

Design

Each ring usually costs between $20,000 to $25,000.

Players with most Stanley Cup rings

This is a list of NHL players with Stanley Cup championship rings won as a player.

See also
List of Stanley Cup Champions

References

External links
 50 years of Stanley Cup rings

National Hockey League trophies and awards
Canadian ice hockey trophies and awards
American ice hockey trophies and awards
Stanley Cup
Championship rings
Awards established in 1893
1893 establishments in Canada